Kyneton railway station is located on the Deniliquin line in Victoria, Australia. It serves the town of Kyneton, and opened on 25 April 1862.

The station is served by V/Line Bendigo, Echuca and Swan Hill line trains, with some peak-hour services to and from Melbourne terminating here.

Between 1977 and 1979, the Kyneton Provender Coy Siding and Watson's Siding were both abolished.

In August 1990, a number of sidings, crossovers, signal posts and the goods shed and goods platform track were all abolished.

The station was upgraded as part of the Regional Fast Rail project in 2005, with the platforms re-aligned, the manual interlocking frame and level crossing gates decommissioned, and remote-controlled computer-based signalling provided. Also as part of the project, the double-track line between Kyneton and Bendigo was singled.

The disused Carlsruhe railway station is located between Kyneton and Woodend. A demolished station was located at Redesdale Junction, between Kyneton and Malmsbury.

Platforms and services
Kyneton has two side platforms. It is served by V/Line Bendigo, Echuca and Swan Hill line trains. All services to Southern Cross depart from Platform 1, while most services towards and beyond Bendigo depart from Platform 2, although some peak-hour services using Platform 1 instead.

Platform 1:
 services to Bendigo, Epsom, Eaglehawk and Southern Cross
 services to Echuca and Southern Cross
 services to Swan Hill and Southern Cross

Platform 2:
 services to Bendigo, Epsom, Eaglehawk and Southern Cross
 services to Echuca and Southern Cross
 services to Swan Hill and Southern Cross

Transport links
Dysons operates four bus routes via Kyneton station, under contract to Public Transport Victoria:
: to Kyneton Town Centre
: to Kyneton Town Centre
: to Kyneton Town Centre
: Kyneton – Trentham

Gallery

References

External links

Victorian Railway Stations gallery
Melway map at street-directory.com.au

Railway stations in Australia opened in 1862
Regional railway stations in Victoria (Australia)
Kyneton, Victoria